Dún Conor is a stone ringfort (cashel) and National Monument located on Inishmaan, Ireland.

Location
Dún Conor is located at the centre of Inishmaan, at the island's highest point.

History
The fort is believed to date back to the first or second millennium BC. At that time, sea levels were lower and the Aran Islands part of the mainland, and the other forts like Dún Aengus were not on the coast. They have been heavily damaged by time and the sea, but Dún Conor's central location has protected it. The name means "Conor's Fort;" legends link it to Conor, son of Hua Mór and brother of Aengus. The size of the forts on the Aran Islands gave rise to the legends of the Fir Bolg.

John O'Donovan visited Dún Conor in 1839. The clocháns in the interior were restored in the 1880s.

Description
It is built in four terraces with internal stairs. The west wall is built atop a natural internal cliff; the other sides are guarded by a second wall, with a bastion in the northeast.

References

Aran Islands
National Monuments in County Galway
Archaeological sites in County Galway